Han Sung-yun (born 12 July 1997) is a South Korean actress and model. She is best known for her roles in dramas such as Who Are You: School 2015, Second 20s and Cheo Yong.

Filmography

Television series

Film

References

External links 
 
 
 

Dongduk Women's University alumni
1997 births
Living people
21st-century South Korean actresses
South Korean female models
South Korean television actresses
South Korean film actresses